Shelford Girls' Grammar is an independent Anglican day school for girls living in Caulfield, a suburb of Melbourne, Victoria, Australia.

The school was established in 1898, and is a member of Girls Sport Victoria (GSV), the Junior School Heads Association of Australia (JSHAA) and the Alliance of Girls' Schools Australasia. It is a non-selective entry school, with more than 600 students.

Shelford has a coeducational Early Learning Centre, which educates toddlers 18 months old, as well as providing groups for 3 and 4-year-olds.

Shelford is a member of Girls Sport Victoria (GSV).

Shelford offers students the Victorian Certificate of Education (VCE) program, as well as the Vocational Education and Training (VET) course.

Shelford uses a house system through which students participate in inter-house competitions, with 4 school houses.

History
The school was established in 1898 on Glen Eira Road by Emily Dixon.

The school was relocated to 77 Allison Road, Elsternwick, by Dora Mary Petrie Blundell, who served as the school's second principal from 1904 to 1921. Dora was supported by her sisters, Lucy Annie Blundell, Fanny Blundell, and Margaret Helen Petrie Blundell.

As the vicar of St Mary's Anglican Church in Caulfield, Henry Langley had been giving the pupils of Shelford Girls' School weekly lessons in religious instruction for many years. In 1922, the Blundell sisters wished to give the school to the church, and they approached Archdeacon Langley, who was responsible for its temporary move from 77 Allison Road, Elsternwick, to St Mary's Jubilee School Hall. The Argus reported on the re-opening and Archdeacon Langley's appointment of Ada Mary Thomas as the school's head mistress:

There was a large gathering of residents of Caulfield and Elsternwick, including several of the neighbouring clergy, to witness the formal reopening of Shelford Girls' School, a long-established Elsternwick school, as a girls' school and kindergarten in connection with St. Mary's Church, Caulfield.Bishop Green, in declaring the school open, congratulated the vicar (Canon Langley) on an initial enrolment of 60 pupils.The mayor of Caulfield (Councillor [Thomas] Falls) and the Rev. [James Valentine] Patton, of Sydney, also spoke.Canon Langley said that the school is to be called by the old name of Shelford, but will be carried on as a Church of England school, under a local council, with A. M. Thomas as principal.It is proposed to build up-to-date school buildings at a site for a branch church near the Caulfield Town Hall [viz., St Margaret's], but for the present the school will meet in the existing school buildings at St. Mary's, Caulfield. — The Argus, 23 February 1922.

The following year, Archdeacon Langley moved the school to "Helenslea" in Hood Crescent, Caulfield North. The school was officially opened at its new location by Archbishop Lees on 22 February 1923 adjacent to St Mary's Church as the Shelford Girls' Grammar School.

Ada Mary Thomas served as Shelford's headmistress from 1922 to 1945.

Notable alumnae 
Brigitte Duclos - Television and radio presenter.
Olympia Valance - Neighbours actor
Krystal Weir - Olympian

See also
 List of schools in Victoria

References

Bibliography 
 Mr. F.W. Eggleston, M.L.A., Opens New Tennis Court at Shelford Girls' School, Table Talk, (Thursday, 26 November 1925), p.22.
 Schools & Colleges: Shelford Girls' School, Table Talk, (Thursday, 26 November 1925), p.30.
 The Woman's World, The (Melbourne) Herald, (Tuesday, 6 September 1932), p.14.
 New Wing at Shelford Girls' Grammar School, The Argus, (Monday, 4 November 1935), p.10.
 Mrs. Dorothea Hann, née Clutterbuck, "Shelford Girls' School", The Age, (tuesday, 1 September 1942), p.2.
 Little Girl Had Big Day at Shelford, The Age, (Thursday, 24 September 1953), p.5.

External links
 Shelford Girls' Grammar Website
 Girls Sport Victoria
 Shelford Girls School, Melbourne (etching, 1936) — Artist: Austin Platt (1912–2003), National Gallery of Australia.

Girls' schools in Victoria (Australia)
Educational institutions established in 1898
Anglican secondary schools in Melbourne
Anglican primary schools in Melbourne
Junior School Heads Association of Australia Member Schools
1898 establishments in Australia
Grammar schools in Australia
Alliance of Girls' Schools Australasia
Buildings and structures in the City of Glen Eira